Kyung-Sook Shin, also Shin Kyung-sook or Shin Kyoung-sook (born 12 January 1963), is a South Korean writer. She was the only South Korean and only woman to win the Man Asian Literary Prize in 2012 for Please Look After Mom.

Life
Kyung-Sook Shin was born in 1963 in a village near Jeongeup, North Jeolla Province in southern South Korea. She was the fourth child and oldest daughter of six. At sixteen she moved to Seoul, where her older brother lived. She worked in an electronics plant while attending night school. She made her literary debut in 1985 with the novella Winter’s Fable after graduating from the Seoul Institute of the Arts as a creative writing major. Along with Kim Insuk and Gong Ji-young, Kyung-Sook Shin is one of the group of female writers known as the 386 Generation.

Career
Kyung-Sook Shin won the Munye Joongang New Author Prize for her novella Winter Fables. She has won a wide variety of literary prizes, including the Today’s Young Artist Award from the South Korean Ministry of Culture, Sports and Tourism; Hankook Ilbo Literature Prize; Hyundae Literature Award; Manhae Literature Prize; Dong-in Literary Award; Yi Sang Literary Award; and the Oh Yeongsu Literature Prize. In 2009 the French translation of her work A Lone Room, La Chambre solitaire, was one of the winners of the Prix de l'inaperçu, which recognizes excellent literary works which have not yet reached a wide audience. The international rights to the million-copy bestseller Please Look After Mother were sold in 19 countries, including the United States and various countries in Europe and Asia, beginning with China. The book was translated into English by Chi-young Kim, and released on March 31, 2011. Kyung-Sook Shin won the 2011 Man Asian Literary Prize for Please Look After Mom, the first woman to do so.

Controversy
On June 16, 2015, The Huffington Post Korea reported that Kyung-Sook Shin had plagiarized Yukio Mishima's passage from the short story Patriotism in her book Legend. Shin apologised; her publisher withdrew a collection of her short stories.

Works
Novels
 Winter Fable (1990)
 Deep Sorrow (1994)
 A Lone Room (1995)
 translated as The Girl Who Wrote Loneliness by Ha-Yun Jung (Pegasus Books, 2015)
 Long Ago, When I Left My Home (1996)
 The Train Departs at 7 (1999)
 Violet (2001)
 translated as Violets by Anton Hur (Feminist Press, 2022)
 J's Story (2002)
 Yi Jin (2007)
 translated as The Court Dancer by Anton Hur  (Pegasus Books, 2018)
 Please Look After Mom (2009)
 translated  Please Look After Mom by Chi-Young Kim (Alfred A. Knopf, 2011)
 I'll Be Right There (2010)
 translated as I'll Be Right There by Sora Kim-Russell (Other Press, 2014)
 The Unknown Women (2011)
 Stories I Wish To Tell the Moon (2013)

Short stories
 "Where the Harmonium Once Stood" (1993)
 translated as The Place Where the Harmonium Was by Agnita Tennant in the Modern Korean Literature Series (ASIA Publishers, 2012)
 "Potato Eaters" (1997)
 "Until It Turns into a River" (1998)
 "Strawberry Fields" (2000)
 "The Sound of Bells" (2003)

Non-fiction
 Beautiful Shade (1995)
 Sleep, Sorrow (2003)

Awards
 Contemporary Literature (Hyundae Munhak) Award (1995)
 Manhae Award for Literature (1996)
 Dong-in Literary Award (1997)
 21st Century Literature Award (2000)
 Yi Sang Literary Award (2001)
 Oh Young-su Literary Award (2006)
 Prix de l'inaperçu (2009)
 Republic of Korea Culture and Arts Award (2011)
 Man Asian Literary Prize (2012)
 Mark of Respect Award (2012)
 Seoul Foreign Correspondents Club Foreign Public Relations Award - Literary Section (2012)
 Ho-Am Prize - Literature Award (2013)

See also
Korean Literature
List of Korean novelists
List of Korean female writers

References

External links
 Interview with Kyung-Sook Shin
 Review of "I'll Be Right There" at KTLIT

External links

 KTLIT's "Shin Kyoung-sook" page

1963 births
South Korean novelists
South Korean women writers
Living people
Yi Sang Literary Award
Recipients of the Ho-Am Prize in the Arts
Sin clan of Pyongsan